Gavajag may refer to:

 Gavajag, Hormozgan, Iran
 Gavajag, Sistan and Baluchestan, a settlement in Sistan and Baluchestan Province, Iran